Mansfieldtown or Mansfieldstown is a townland and a former Church of Ireland parish located between Castlebellingham and Tallanstown in County Louth, Ireland.

It was called Mandelvelleston, Mandevilleston and many other names in historical documents. The name is derived from an Anglo-Norman 
family called Maundeville, which settled there soon after 1172.

After the Rebellion of 1641 Theobald Taaffe, Earl 
of Carlingford, acquired the greater part of the 
parish. The Plunkett family of Bawn, the Gernons in Wottonstown 
and Gilbertstown and the Clintons in Derrycamagh were dispossessed.

The population in 1821 was 1,081 ; in 1831, 1,062 ; in 1841, 
1,107 ;in 1851, 652 ; in 1861, 471 ; in 1871, 445 ; in 1881, 
395 ; in 1891, 296 ; in 1901, 266 (of whom one was a Protestant, the rest Roman Catholics).

References
 

Townlands of County Louth